The 2002 Nebraska Cornhuskers baseball team represented the University of Nebraska in the 2002 NCAA Division I baseball season. The head coach was Dave Van Horn, serving his 5th year.

The Cornhuskers lost in the College World Series, defeated by the South Caroline Gamecocks.

Roster

Schedule 

! style="" | Regular Season (39–17)
|- valign="top" 

|- align="center" bgcolor="#ddffdd"
| 1 || February 13 || vs.  || No. 11 || Reckling Park • Houston, Texas || W 3–2 || 1–0 || —
|- align="center" bgcolor="#ffdddd"
| 2 || February 14 || at No. 10  || No. 11 || Reckling Park • Houston, Texas || L 7–8 || 1–1 || —
|- align="center" bgcolor="#ffdddd"
| 3 || February 15 || vs. No. 15  || No. 11 || Reckling Park • Houston, Texas || L 8–9 || 1–2 || —
|- align="center" bgcolor="#ddffdd"
| 4 || February 22 || at  || No. 13 || Joe Miller Ballpark • Lake Charles, Louisiana || W 9–4 || 2–2 || —
|- align="center" bgcolor="#ddffdd"
| 5 || February 23 || vs.  || No. 13 || Joe Miller Ballpark • Lake Charles, Louisiana || W 4–1 || 3–2 || —
|- align="center" bgcolor="#ffdddd"
| 6 || February 24 || vs.  || No. 13 || Joe Miller Ballpark • Lake Charles, Louisiana || L 5–6 || 3–3 || —
|- align="center" bgcolor="#ddffdd"
| 7 || February 28 || at  || No. 19 || Pete Beiden Field at Bob Bennett Stadium • Fresno, California || W 7–1 || 4–3 || —
|-

|- align="center" bgcolor="#ddffdd"
| 8 || March 1 || at Fresno State || No. 19 || Pete Beiden Field at Bob Bennett Stadium • Fresno, California || W 9–0 || 5–3 || —
|- align="center" bgcolor="#ddffdd"
| 9 || March 2 || at Fresno State || No. 19 || Pete Beiden Field at Bob Bennett Stadium • Fresno, California || W 10–6 || 6–3 || —
|- align="center" bgcolor="#ddffdd"
| 10 || March 5 ||  || No. 17 || Haymarket Park • Lincoln, Nebraska || W 23–1 || 7–3 || —
|- align="center" bgcolor="#ddffdd"
| 11 || March 8 || at No. 14  || No. 17 || Baylor Ballpark • Waco, Texas || W 15–4 || 8–3 || 1–0
|- align="center" bgcolor="#ffdddd"
| 12 || March 9 || at No. 14 Baylor || No. 17 || Baylor Ballpark • Waco, Texas || L 1–2 || 8–4 || 1–1
|- align="center" bgcolor="#ffdddd"
| 13 || March 10 || at No. 14 Baylor || No. 17 || Baylor Ballpark • Waco, Texas || L 6–9 || 8–5 || 1–2
|- align="center" bgcolor="#ddffdd"
| 14 || March 15 || No. 13  || No. 21 || Haymarket Park • Lincoln, Nebraska || W 6–4 || 9–5 || 2–2
|- align="center" bgcolor="#ddffdd"
| 15 || March 16 || No. 13 Texas A&M || No. 21 || Haymarket Park • Lincoln, Nebraska || W 3–0 || 10–5 || 3–2
|- align="center" bgcolor="#ddffdd"
| 16 || March 17 || No. 13 Texas A&M || No. 21 || Haymarket Park • Lincoln, Nebraska || W 10–0 || 11–5 || 4–2
|- align="center" bgcolor="#ddffdd"
| 17 || March 19 || at  || No. 13 || Hubert H. Humphrey Metrodome • Minneapolis, Minnesota || W 19–6 || 12–5 || —
|- align="center" bgcolor="#ffdddd"
| 18 || March 20 || at Minnesota || No. 13 || Hubert H. Humphrey Metrodome • Minneapolis, Minnesota || L 3–5 || 12–6 || —
|- align="center" bgcolor="#ddffdd"
| 19 || March 22 || No. 22  || No. 13 || Haymarket Park • Lincoln, Nebraska || W 3–1 || 13–6 || 5–2
|- align="center" bgcolor="#ddffdd"
| 20 || March 23 || No. 22 Texas Tech || No. 13 || Haymarket Park • Lincoln, Nebraska || W 8–3 || 14–6 || 6–2
|- align="center" bgcolor="#ffdddd"
| 21 || March 24 || No. 22 Texas Tech || No. 13 || Haymarket Park • Lincoln, Nebraska || L 3–4 || 14–7 || 6–3
|- align="center" bgcolor="#ddffdd"
| 22 || March 26 ||  || No. 10 || Haymarket Park • Lincoln, Nebraska || W 10–2 || 15–7 || —
|- align="center" bgcolor="#ddffdd"
| 23 || March 27 || Western Illinois || No. 10 || Haymarket Park • Lincoln, Nebraska || W 12–5 || 16–7 || —
|- align="center" bgcolor="#ffdddd"
| 24 || March 29 || at  || No. 10 || KSU Baseball Stadium • Manhattan, Kansas || L 8–9 || 16–8 || 6–4
|- align="center" bgcolor="#ddffdd"
| 25 || March 30 || at Kansas State || No. 10 || KSU Baseball Stadium • Manhattan, Kansas || W 22–6 || 17–8 || 7–4
|- align="center" bgcolor="#ffdddd"
| 26 || March 31 || at Kansas State || No. 10 || KSU Baseball Stadium • Manhattan, Kansas || L 2–3 || 17–9 || 7–5
|-

|- align="center" bgcolor="#ddffdd"
| 27 || April 2 ||  || No. 13 || Haymarket Park • Lincoln, Nebraska || W 10–1 || 18–9 || —
|- align="center" bgcolor="#ddffdd"
| 28 || April 3 || Milwaukee || No. 13 || Haymarket Park • Lincoln, Nebraska || W 16–1 || 19–9 || —
|- align="center" bgcolor="#ffdddd"
| 29 || April 5 || No. 17  || No. 13 || Haymarket Park • Lincoln, Nebraska || L 4–5 || 19–10 || 7–6
|- align="center" bgcolor="#ddffdd"
| 30 || April 6 || at No. 17 Oklahoma || No. 13 || Haymarket Park • Lincoln, Nebraska || W 7–6 || 20–10 || 8–6
|- align="center" bgcolor="#ddffdd"
| 31 || April 7 || at No. 17 Oklahoma || No. 13 || Haymarket Park • Lincoln, Nebraska || W 12–2 || 21–10 || 9–6
|- align="center" bgcolor="#ffdddd"
| 32 || April 9 || at  || No. 10 || Creighton Sports Complex • Omaha, Nebraska || L 3–8 || 21–11 || —
|- align="center" bgcolor="#ddffdd"
| 33 || April 10 || Minnesota || No. 10 || Haymarket Park • Lincoln, Nebraska || W 12–3 || 22–11 || —
|- align="center" bgcolor="#ffdddd"
| 34 || April 12 || at Missouri || No. 10 || Taylor Stadium • Columbia, Missouri || L 6–9 || 22–12 || 9–7
|- align="center" bgcolor="#ddffdd"
| 35 || April 13 || at Missouri || No. 10 || Taylor Stadium • Columbia, Missouri || W 6–3 || 23–12 || 10–7
|- align="center" bgcolor="#ffdddd"
| 36 || April 14 || at Missouri || No. 10 || Taylor Stadium • Columbia, Missouri || L 12–16 || 23–13 || 10–8
|- align="center" bgcolor="#ddffdd"
| 37 || April 16 || Creighton || No. 20 || Haymarket • Lincoln, Nebraska || W 6–5 || 24–13 || —
|- align="center" bgcolor="#ddffdd"
| 38 || April 19 || at No. 15  || No. 20 || Allie P. Reynolds Stadium • Stillwater, Oklahoma || W 5–2 || 25–13 || 11–8
|- align="center" bgcolor="#ffdddd"
| 39 || April 20 || at No. 15 Oklahoma State || No. 20 || Allie P. Reynolds Stadium • Stillwater, Oklahoma || L 4–8 || 25–14 || 11–9
|- align="center" bgcolor="#ddffdd"
| 40 || April 21 || at No. 15 Oklahoma State || No. 20 || Allie P. Reynolds Stadium • Stillwater, Oklahoma || W 10–3 || 26–14 || 12–9
|- align="center" bgcolor="#ddffdd"
| 41 || April 23 ||  || No. 15 || Haymarket Park • Lincoln, Nebraska || W 18–1 || 27–14 || —
|- align="center" bgcolor="#ddffdd"
| 42 || April 24 || Texas–Pan American || No. 15 || Haymarket Park • Lincoln, Nebraska || W 10–2 || 28–14 || —
|- align="center" bgcolor="#ddffdd"
| 43 || April 26 ||  || No. 15 || Haymarket Park • Lincoln, Nebraska || W 4–0 || 29–14 || 13–9
|- align="center" bgcolor="#ffdddd"
| 44 || April 28 || Kansas || No. 15 || Haymarket Park • Lincoln, Nebraska || L 3–14 || 29–15 || 13–10
|- align="center" bgcolor="#ddffdd"
| 45 || April 28 || Kansas || No. 15 || Haymarket Park • Lincoln, Nebraska || W 9–1 || 30–15 || 14–10
|- align="center" bgcolor="#ffdddd"
| 46 || April 30 || No. 14  || No. 15 || Haymarket Park • Lincoln, Nebraska || L 4–9 || 30–16 || —
|-

|- align="center" bgcolor="#ddffdd"
| 47 || May 3 || at No. 5 Texas || No. 15 || Disch–Falk Field • Austin, Texas || W 8–3 || 31–16 || 15–10
|- align="center" bgcolor="#ffdddd"
| 48 || May 4 || at No. 5 Texas || No. 15 || Disch–Falk Field • Austin, Texas || L 2–3 || 31–17 || 15–11
|- align="center" bgcolor="#ddffdd"
| 49 || May 5 || at No. 5 Texas || No. 15 || Disch–Falk Field • Austin, Texas || W 7–5 || 32–17 || 16–11
|- align="center" bgcolor="#ddffdd"
| 50 || May 10 ||   || No. 15 || Haymarket Park • Lincoln, Nebraska || W 4–3 || 33–17 || —
|- align="center" bgcolor="#ddffdd"
| 51 || May 11 || Cal Poly  || No. 15 || Haymarket Park • Lincoln, Nebraska || W 7–3 || 34–17 || —
|- align="center" bgcolor="#ddffdd"
| 52 || May 12 || Cal Poly  || No. 15 || Haymarket Park • Lincoln, Nebraska || W 5–2 || 35–17 || —
|- align="center" bgcolor="#ddffdd"
| 53 || May 15 || at Creighton || No. 13 || Johnny Rosenblatt Stadium • Omaha, Nebraska || W 9–1 || 36–17 || —
|- align="center" bgcolor="#ddffdd"
| 54 || May 17 ||  || No. 13 || Haymarket Park • Lincoln, Nebraska || W 12–2 || 37–17 || —
|- align="center" bgcolor="#ddffdd"
| 55 || May 18 || Louisiana Tech || No. 13 || Haymarket Park • Lincoln, Nebraska || W 7–1 || 38–17 || —
|- align="center" bgcolor="#ddffdd"
| 56 || May 19 || Louisiana Tech || No. 13 || Haymarket Park • Lincoln, Nebraska || W 5–1 || 39–17 || —
|-

|-
! style="" | Postseason (8–4)
|- valign="top"

|- align="center" bgcolor="#ddffdd"
| 57 || May 22 || vs. (7) No. 29 Baylor || (2) No. 13 || The Ballpark in Arlington • Arlington, Texas || W 11–9 || 40–17 || 1–0
|- align="center" bgcolor="#ddffdd"
| 58 || May 23 || vs. (3) No. 17 Texas Tech || (2) No. 13 || The Ballpark in Arlington • Arlington, Texas || W 12–8 || 41–17 || 2–0
|- align="center" bgcolor="#ddffdd"
| 59 || May 25 || vs. (6) Kansas State || (2) No. 13 || The Ballpark in Arlington • Arlington, Texas || W 8–7 || 42–17 || 3–0
|- align="center" bgcolor="#ffdddd"
| 60 || May 26 || vs. (1) No. 5 Texas || (2) No. 13 || The Ballpark in Arlington • Arlington, Texas || L 6–9 || 42–18 || 3–1
|-

|- align="center" bgcolor="#ddffdd"
| 61 || May 31 || (4) Milwaukee || (1) No. 12 || Haymarket Park • Lincoln, Nebraska || W 7–2 || 43–18 || 1–0
|- align="center" bgcolor="#ddffdd"
| 62 || June 1 || (3)  || (1) No. 12 || Haymarket Park • Lincoln, Nebraska || W 9–1 || 44–18 || 2–0
|- align="center" bgcolor="#ddffdd"
| 63 || June 2 || (2) No. 28  || (1) No. 12 || Haymarket Park • Lincoln, Nebraska || W 14–3 || 3–0 || 16–11
|- 

|- align="center" bgcolor="#ddffdd"
| 64 || June 7 || No. 13  || No. 10 || Haymarket Park • Lincoln, Nebraska || W 2–0 || 46–18 || 4–0
|- align="center" bgcolor="#ffdddd"
| 65 || June 8 || No. 13 Richmond || No. 10 || Haymarket Park • Lincoln, Nebraska || L 2–6 || 46–19 || 4–1
|- align="center" bgcolor="#ddffdd"
| 66 || June 9 || No. 13 Richmond || No. 10 || Haymarket Park • Lincoln, Nebraska || W 11–6 || 47–19 || 5–1
|-

|- align="center" bgcolor="#ffdddd"
| 67 || June 14 || vs. (2) No. 4 Clemson || No. 7 || Johnny Rosenblatt Stadium • Omaha, Nebraska || L 10–11 || 47–20 || 16–11
|- align="center" bgcolor="#ffdddd"
| 68 || June 16 || vs. (6) No. 3 South Carolina || No. 7 || Johnny Rosenblatt Stadium • Omaha, Nebraska || L 8–10 || 47–21 || 16–11
|-

Awards and honors 
Jeff Blevins
 Honorable Mention All-Big 12

Will Bolt
 Honorable Mention All-Big 12

Daniel Bruce
 Honorable Mention Freshman All-American Collegiate Baseball

Brian Duensing
 Honorable Mention Freshman All-American Collegiate Baseball

Shane Komine
 Second Team All-American American Baseball Coaches Association
 Second Team All-American Baseball America
 Third Team All-American NBCSA

Jeff Leise
 First Team All-Big 12

Aaron Marsden
 First Team All-Big 12
 Big 12 Conference Baseball Newcomer of the Year

Jed Morris
 First Team All-Big 12
 Big 12 Conference Baseball Player of the Year
 Third Team All-American Baseball America

Phil Shirek
 Honorable Mention Freshman All-American Collegiate Baseball

References 

Nebraska Cornhuskers baseball seasons
Nebraska Cornhuskers baseball
Nebraska
2002 NCAA Division I baseball tournament participants
College World Series seasons